Alverca do Ribatejo is a city (cidade) and a former civil parish in the municipality of Vila Franca de Xira, Portugal.  In 2013, the parish merged into the new parish Alverca do Ribatejo e Sobralinho.

It was promoted to city status in 1990. It is a city and a suburb near the Tagus River (rio Tejo), in the Lisbon metropolitan area.

Alverca has been deeply connected with aviation since the early 20th century.  A military air base was built there in 1918.  The aerospace company OGMA, the Portuguese Air Force General Storage, the Air Force Aerodrome Engineering Unit and a branch of the Air Museum are presently based there.  The Alverca aviation facilities also housed the first international airport of Portugal, closed after the inauguration of Lisbon Airport in 1942.

References

Cities in Portugal
Former parishes of Vila Franca de Xira